Jérôme Éyana (born 5 July 1977 in Paris) is a French sprinter who specializes in the 100 metres and 60 metres. He competed in the men's 4 × 100 metres relay at the 2000 Summer Olympics.

At the 2002 European Championships he finished fourth in 4x100 m relay with teammates David Patros, Issa-Aimé Nthépé and Ronald Pognon. He finished sixth in the 60 metres at the 2003 IAAF World Indoor Championships in Birmingham, equalling his personal best time of 6.64 seconds.

His personal best time over 100m is 10.25 seconds, achieved at the 2001 Summer Universiade in Beijing.

Running career
Jérôme arrived at Antony Athletisme 92 Club in 1996 and first trained with Serge Iotti, after soccer, boxing and (street) basketball, Jérôme discovered athletics at 18, using an enrollment form that his brother hasn't used at a local club "just to see". Originally from Cameroon, he has a competitive spirit, likes soul music and devoted his season to athletics "to make like a great champion." The same year he ran his first 60m at l'INSEP in 6"87 and the 100m in 10"67 with that mark he was qualified for the IAAF World Junior Championships in Athletics in Sydney but injury preventing him from competing.

2005
 Co-Silver Medalist in 4x100m at The 4th Jeux de la Francophonie in Niamey
 Finalist in 100m at The 4th Jeux de la Francophonie
2003
 Finalist [6th place] in 60m at The 9th IAAF World Indoor Championships in Birmingham, UK
 Semi Finalist at The 9th IAAF World Championship in Paris with 4x100m relay
2002
 Finalist with 4x100m relay at the 18th European Athletics Championship in Munich, Germany
2001
 Finalist [6th place] in 100m at the Universiades in Pekin, China.
 Semi Finalist in 100m at The 4th Jeux de la Francophonie in Ottawa, Canada.
 Semi Finalist in 60m at Indoor The 8th IAAF World Championship in Lisbon, Portugal
 Team member in 4x100m relay in 7th IAAF World Championship in Edmonton, Canada
2000
 Team member in 4x100m relay in The Olympic Games in Sydney, Australia
1999
 Team member in 4x100m relay in World Championship in Sevilla, Spain
 Finalist [5th place] in 100m at European Athletics U23 Championship in Göteborg, Sweden
 Silver Medalist with 4x100m at European Athletics U23 Championship in Gôteborg, Sweden
 Team member in 4x100m relay in I 7th AAF World Championship in Seville, Spain
1997
 Semi Finalist in 100m at European Athletics U23 Championship in Turku, Finland
 Finalist with 4x100m at European Athletics U23 Championship in Turku, Finland

References

External links

Jerome Eyana Profile
Le Miraculé
L'Equipe.fr
Photos 4x100m The 9th IAAF World Championships, Paris
Sportquick.com photo meeting
 Olympic Sport

1977 births
Living people
French male sprinters
Athletes from Paris
Athletes (track and field) at the 2000 Summer Olympics
Olympic athletes of France